The 2022 GT Cup Championship is the 16th GT Cup Championship, a British sports car championship. The season began on 9 April at Donington Park and end on 9 October at Snetterton Circuit, after twenty-six races held over seven meetings.

Calendar
The calendar was announced on 14 October 2020. The championship will support the 2022 GT World Challenge Europe Sprint Cup at Brands Hatch.

Teams and drivers
Classes:

{|
|

References

External links

Sports car racing series
GT Cup Championship
GT Cup Championship